Kent is a hamlet in the town of  Kendall within Orleans County, New York, United States. Kent has a post office with ZIP code 14477, which opened on March 30, 1835.

References

Hamlets in Orleans County, New York
Hamlets in New York (state)